The 1997–98 FA Trophy was the twenty-ninth season of the FA Trophy. This was the first year that penalty kicks were used to settle drawn replays, prior to this multiple replays were possible.

First qualifying round

Ties

Replays

Second qualifying round

Ties

Replays

Third qualifying round

Ties

Replays

1st round
The teams that given byes to this round are Woking, Hereford United, Kidderminster Harriers, Stevenage Borough, Morecambe, Northwich Victoria, Farnborough Town, Hednesford Town, Telford United, Gateshead, Southport, Rushden & Diamonds, Stalybridge Celtic, Kettering Town, Hayes, Slough Town, Dover Athletic, Welling United, Halifax Town, Leek Town, Yeovil Town, Cheltenham Town, Guiseley, Enfield, Hyde United, Gresley Rovers, Chorley, Gloucester City, Bishop Auckland, Colwyn Bay, Dagenham & Redbridge and Ashton United.

Ties

Replays

2nd round

Ties

Replays

3rd round

Ties

Replays

4th round

Ties

Replays

Semi finals

First leg

Second leg

Final

Tie

References

General
 Football Club History Database: FA Trophy 1997-98

Specific

1997–98 domestic association football cups
League
1997-98